Visakha Utsav is a tourism event every year conducted by the Andhra Pradesh Tourism Development Corporation and Visakhapatnam Metropolitan Region Development Authority at Visakhapatnam.

History
Visakha Utsav first time started at the year of 1997 from that day onward every year in December month this tourism event is conducted by the Government of Andhra Pradesh.

About
Main aim of the utsav is to promote the culture, arts, crafts, music and dance of Visakhapatnam and Andhra Pradesh.

References

Tourism in Andhra Pradesh
Uttarandhra